Mount Shaman is a mountain in the Southern Muya Range, Stanovoy Highlands, Russia. Administratively it is located in the Zabaykalsky Krai of the Russian Far East.

At  Mount Shaman is the highest peak of the Transbaikal side of the Southern Muya Range.

See also
List of mountains and hills of Russia
List of ultras of Northeast Asia
Muisky Gigant, the highest peak of the range on the Buryatia side

References

External links
Гора Шаман

Shaman